Kalley may refer to:
Robert Reid Kalley (1809-1888), Scottish physician and missionary
Kalley, Kermanshah, a village in Iran